Comignago is a comune (municipality) in the Province of Novara in the Italian region of Piedmont, located about  northeast of Turin and about  north of Novara.

Comignago borders the following municipalities: Arona, Borgo Ticino, Castelletto sopra Ticino, Dormelletto, Gattico-Veruno and Oleggio Castello.

References

Cities and towns in Piedmont